The Swiss cheese model of accident causation is a model used in risk analysis and risk management, including aviation safety, engineering, healthcare, emergency service organizations, and as the principle behind layered security, as used in computer security and defense in depth. It likens human systems to multiple slices of Swiss cheese, which has randomly placed and sized holes in each slice, stacked side by side, in which the risk of a threat becoming a reality is mitigated by the differing layers and types of defenses which are "layered" behind each other.  Therefore, in theory, lapses and weaknesses in one defense do not allow a risk to materialize (e.g. a hole in each slice in the stack aligning with holes in all other slices), since other defenses also exist (e.g. other slices of cheese), to prevent a single point of failure. The model was originally formally propounded by James T. Reason of the University of Manchester, and has since gained widespread acceptance.  It is sometimes called the "cumulative act effect".

Although the Swiss cheese model is respected and considered to be a useful method of relating concepts, it has been subject to criticism that it is used too broadly, and without enough other models or support.

Holes and slices

In the Swiss cheese model, an organisation's defenses against failure are modeled as a series of imperfect barriers, represented as slices of cheese, specifically Swiss cheese with holes known as "eyes", such as Emmental cheese. The holes in the slices represent weaknesses in individual parts of the system and are continually varying in size and position across the slices. The system produces failures when a hole in each slice momentarily aligns, permitting (in Reason's words) "a trajectory of accident opportunity", so that a hazard passes through holes in all of the slices, leading to a failure.

Frosch described Reason's model in mathematical terms as a model in percolation theory, which he analyses as a Bethe lattice.

Active and latent failures
The model includes Active and Passive  failures. Active failures encompass the unsafe acts that can be directly linked to an accident, such as (in the case of aircraft accidents) a navigation error. Latent failures include contributory factors that may lie dormant for days, weeks, or months until they contribute to the accident. Latent failures span the first three domains of failure in Reason's model.

In the early days of the Swiss Cheese model, late 1980 to about 1992, attempts were made to combine two theories: James Reason's multi-layer defence model and Willem Albert Wagenaar's tripod theory of accident causation. This resulted in a period in which the Swiss Cheese diagram was represented with the slices of cheese labelled as Active Failures, Preconditions and Latent Failures.

These attempts to combine these theories still causes confusion today. A more correct version of the combined theories is shown with the Active Failures (now called immediate causes) Precondition and Latent Failure (now called underlying causes) shown as the reason each barrier (slice of cheese) has a hole in it and the slices of cheese as the barriers.

Applications

The same framework can be applicable in some areas of healthcare. For example, a latent failure could be the similar packaging of two drugs that are then stored close to each other in a pharmacy. This failure would be a contributory factor in the administration of the wrong drug to a patient. Such research led to the realization that medical error can be the result of "system flaws, not character flaws", and that greed, ignorance, malice or laziness are not the only causes of error.

The framework has also been applied to a range of other areas. For example, Lubnau, Lubnau, and Okray apply the model to the engineering of firefighting systems, aiming to reduce human errors by "inserting additional layers of cheese into the system", namely the techniques of Crew Resource Management. Olson and Raz apply the model to improve deception in the methodology of experimental studies, with multiple thin layers of cheese representing subtle components of deception which hide the study hypothesis.

See also 

 Chain of events (accident analysis)
 Healthcare error proliferation model
 Iteration
 Latent human error
 Mitigation
 Proximate and ultimate causation
 Proximate cause
 Redundancy (engineering)
 Root cause analysis
 System accident
 Systems engineering
 Systems modelling

References

Sources
 

Error
Failure
Safety engineering
Hazard analysis
Aviation safety
Scientific models